Lowman is a surname. People with the surname include:

 David Lowman (intelligence official) (1921–1999), American executive for the National Security Agency
 David Lowman (priest) (born 1948), British Anglican priest and former archdeacon
 Guy Lowman (1877–1943), American football, basketball, and baseball coach and baseball player 
 Guy Sumner Lowman Jr. (1909–1941), American linguist
 G. E. Lowman (1897–1965), American Methodist minister and radio evangelist
 Margaret D. Lowman (born 1953), American biologist, ecologist, writer, and explorer
 Mary D. Lowman (1842–1912), American mayor
 Moses Lowman (1680–1752), an English nonconformist minister
 Nate Lowman (born 1979), American artist
 Paul Lowman, Canadian musician
 Paul D. Lowman (1931–2011), American geophysicist
 Rodney L. Lowman (born 1949), American psychologist
 Seymour Lowman (1868–1940), American lawyer and Lieutenant Governor of New York

Fictional characters include:
 Happy (Sons of Anarchy), on the television show Sons of Anarchy

See also
 Loman (surname)
 Lohman (disambiguation)